Salterellidae is a family of enigmatic fossil genera from the Early to Middle Cambrian. It was originally created for the genus Salterella by Charles Doolittle Walcott, who placed it in the group Pteropoda. It was later placed in Agmata, a proposed extinct phylum by Ellis L. Yochelson which is accepted by some other authors.

Genera
 †Ellisell Peel & Berg-Madsen, 1988
 †Ellisell yochelsoni Peel & Berg-Madsen, 1988
 †Salterella Billings, 1861
 †Salterella conulata Clark, 1924
 †Salterella maccullochi (Murchison, 1859)
 †Volborthella Schmidt, 1888
 †Volborthella tenuis Schmidt, 1888

References

Prehistoric animal families
Prehistoric animal enigmatic taxa
Taxa named by Charles Doolittle Walcott
Animal families